"Living on the Ceiling" is a song by English synth-pop band Blancmange. It was released as the band's third single in 1982, taken from their debut studio album Happy Families. It became the band's first (and biggest) UK Top 40 hit, peaking at No. 7 on the UK Singles Chart and being certified Silver by the BPI for sales in excess of 200,000 copies. The single also reached No. 5 on the Australian Singles Chart.

Blancmange performed the song on Top of the Pops, but for broadcast on the show as well as on BBC Radio, the track was edited to replace the lyric "Up the bloody tree" with "Up the cuckoo tree". However, in a subsequent episode of Top of the Pops where the song was used as the 'play-out track' without the band in the studio, the original "bloody" lyric was left in and was clearly audible.

Style
Reporting a 2011 interview with lead singer Neil Arthur, Sarah Nixey suggested that ".. it was the Indian influences of Pandit Dinesh on tablas and Deepak Khazauchi on sitar who had both given "Living on the Ceiling" its alluring flavour" describing the single as "Middle Eastern tinged". Of the album from which it was drawn Nixey wrote: "Fusing the rhythmic dash of Talking Heads with the intensity of Joy Division plus the melodic framework of OMD and Yazoo on top, Arthur and Luscombe won critical admiration and respectable sales for their debut."

Music video
The promotional video, made to accompany the song, was set in Cairo, Egypt and was directed by Clive Richardson.

Chart performance

Weekly charts

Year-end charts

References

External links
 

1982 songs
1982 singles
Blancmange (band) songs
London Records singles
Songs written by Neil Arthur
Songs written by Stephen Luscombe
Song recordings produced by Mike Howlett